Meliosma linearifolia is a species of plant in the Sabiaceae family. It is endemic to Panama.  It is threatened by habitat loss.

References

Flora of Panama
linearifolia
Endangered plants
Taxonomy articles created by Polbot